Dour (Urdu: ڈور  transl. Thread) is a 2021 Pakistani mystery and thriller drama television series produced by Abdullah Kadwani and Asad Qureshi under the banner of 7th Sky Entertainment. It is directed by Mazhar Moin and written by Saji Gul. It stars Sania Saeed, Azfar Rehman, Hina Altaf and Ali Abbas in lead roles. The drama serial broadcasts on Geo Entertainment after it premiered on 29 June 2021. It is available to watch digitally on YouTube.

Plot 
Mrs. Ehtishaam has provided her sons with every luxury in the world. One of her sons, Abaan, is unable to live life to the fullest as he happens to be handicapped. However, her sons are unaware of a tragic secret she has been withholding from them, especially from Romaan who is always at his best behavior and is an asset to the family business. After years of causing distress to his family, Abaan finds a new target after Romaan introduces his family to the love of his life, Asma.

Cast 

 Azfar Rehman as Abaan
 Hina Aagha as Asma 
 Ali Abbas as Romaan 
 Sania Saeed as Mrs. Ehtisham (Abaan & Romaan's mother)
 Adla Khan as Yasmeen
 Iffat Omar as Phuppo Qulsoom
 Haris Waheed as Adil
 Saleem Mairaj as Shokat 
 Nayyar Ejaz as Sabir (Asma & Yasmeen's father) (Dead)
 Emaan Ahmed as Guriya 
 Hania Ahmed as Haniya 
 Mizna Waqas as Geeti 
 Nataliya as Poro Chisti
 Hameedullah Khan as Hameed 
 Musazam Shah as Rehmat Bibi
 Salman Arif as Salman
 Meesam Naqvi as Hashim
 Fazila Qazi as Ruqaiyya (guest appearance)
 Javed as Yasir (guest appearance)
Agha Mustafa Hassan as Bilal

References

External links 
Official website

2021 Pakistani television series debuts
2021 Pakistani television series endings
Urdu-language television shows
Pakistani drama television series
Geo TV original programming